Neuthrone is the third full-length album by the Polish blackened death metal band Crionics. The album was originally released under Candlelight Records, but it was also released under Mystic Production. The album was released as an enhanced audio disc with a video of Humanmeat Cargo and bonus track Black Warriors and was recorded at Zed Studio 2006 till 2007 and was produced, engineered and mastered by Tomasz Zalewski who also recorded the last albums of Thy Disease, Totem, Horrorscope and many others.

The video clip was recorded by Besz Film in Gliwice, Poland. After working on the video clip for 6 days, War-A.N. comments:

The album is a concept album describing apocalyptic events where an ancient extraterrestrial civilization known as the "Rye’eh-X’D’aah" ransack the Earth, enslave, and transform humanity.

From the album liner notes:
 
Crionics - Neuthrone - Introduction

"Thousands of years before Christ, the extraterrestrial civilization of Rye’eh-X’D’aah – the Demiurgs who since the beginning of time had been wandering in search of the Harbour (the optimal climate conditions and resources to enable their Great System to function most efficiently) one day encountered Mother Earth. Unfortunately, the atmosphere and lack of technology (neutron-climate control and extermination technology was still being developed) made it impossible to take control of the planet and settle on it. The Rye’eh-X’D’yh devised a lengthy but effective and safe solution to the problem. After series of tests and experiments, Leaders’ Council selected a few hundred of the best-developed, healthiest specimens of both sexes of Homo sapiens. They were taken along on the next part of the voyage, most of which they spent in cryogenic chambers, being reproduced, experimented on and modified genetically, so that their new fathers could raise a new species, the Homo superior, a doomsday device in the hands of the Demiurgs…"

Track listing 

 "Introduction" - 1:19
 "New Pantheon" - 3:36
 "Arrival 2033" - 3:09
 "Neu.Throne.Aeon" - 4:29
 "Superiors" - 4:06
 "Hell Earth" - 2:57
 "Humanmeat Cargo" - 3:39
 "Outer Empire" - 4:58
 "Frozen Hope" - 5:40
 "When The Sun Goes Out..." - 4:52
 "Black Warriors" (Bonus track) - 4:51

Notes 
  An enhanced audio disc with a video of Humanmeat Cargo was included.
  The bonus track Black Warriors is a re-recording of the '98 demo track.

Personnel 

Band members
 Michał "War-A.N" Skotniczny - lead vocals, rhythm guitar
 Dariusz "Yanuary" Styczeń - bass, backing vocals
 Wacław "Vac-V" Borowiec - keyboards, electronics, backing vocals
 Maciej "Darkside" Kowalski - drums, percussions

Production personnel 
 Tomasz Zalewski - engineering, mastering
 Michał "Czecza" Czekaj - photo shoot, cover art, designs

Release dates 
Release dates are confirmed by their website.

External links 
 Official Page
 Encyclopaedia Metallum

References 

2007 albums
Crionics albums
Mystic Production albums